Timothy Mark Burgess (born August 11, 1956) is a Senior United States district judge of the United States District Court for the District of Alaska. He served as the District of Alaska's U.S. Attorney from 2001 to 2005.

Education and career

Burgess was born in San Francisco, California. He received an Associate of Arts degree from Cañada College in 1976. He then attended the University of Alaska Fairbanks on a basketball scholarship, earning a Bachelor of Arts degree in 1978 and a Master of Business Administration degree in 1982. He received his Juris Doctor from Northeastern University School of Law in 1987. He went into private practice in Anchorage, Alaska, with the law firm then known as Gilmore & Feldman from 1987 to 1989. Burgess served as an Assistant United States Attorney in the District of Alaska from 1989 to 2001 and then as the United States Attorney until 2005.

Federal judicial service

He was nominated by George W. Bush on July 28, 2005, to the seat on the United States District Court for the District of Alaska vacated by James Keith Singleton Jr. He was confirmed by the United States Senate on December 21, 2005, and received commission on January 23, 2006. He served as Chief Judge from December 31, 2015 to December 31, 2021, the same date he assumed senior status.

Personal life

Burgess and his wife, Joanne Grace, reside in Anchorage and have four children.

References

Sources

1956 births
Living people
21st-century American judges
Assistant United States Attorneys
Judges of the United States District Court for the District of Alaska
Lawyers from San Francisco
Northeastern University School of Law alumni
United States Attorneys for the District of Alaska
United States district court judges appointed by George W. Bush
University of Alaska Fairbanks alumni
University of Alaska regents